This is a list of notable synagogues in Uganda.

Kampala
Beit Ha'Am - Marom
Kampala Jewish Synagogue

Magada, Namutumba District
Namutumba Synagogue

Nabugoye
Moses Synagogue

Namanyonyi
Namanyonyi Synagogue

Nesenyi
Nasenyi Synagogue

Putti
Putti Synagogue

See also
Abayudaya
History of the Jews in Uganda

References

External links
Uganda, Sub-Saharan African Synagogues

Jews and Judaism in Uganda
Uganda
Synagogues in Africa
Synagogues